is a carbonaceous trinary asteroid, classified as near-Earth object and former potentially hazardous asteroid of the Amor group, approximately  in diameter. It was discovered by the Lincoln Near-Earth Asteroid Research project at Lincoln Lab's Experimental Test Site in Socorro, New Mexico, on 20 September 2001. The two synchronous minor-planet moons measure approximately 770 and 430 meters and have an orbital period of 16.46 and 150 hours, respectively.

Numbering and naming 

This minor planet was numbered by the Minor Planet Center on 2 April 2007. As of 2018, the primary and its moons have not been named. In the scientific literature, the components of the trinary system are generically referred to as Alpha, Beta and Gamma, but these labels are not recognized by the IAU.

Primary 

, the primary object of this trinary system, is an unusual carbonaceous near-Earth asteroid of a C- or somewhat brighter B-type. It orbits the Sun at a distance of 1.0–2.9 AU once every 2 years and 10 months (1,023 days). Its orbit has an eccentricity of 0.48 and an inclination of 7° with respect to the ecliptic. A first precovery was taken at Palomar Observatory during the Digitized Sky Survey in 1990, extending the body's observation arc by 11 years prior to its official discovery observation at Socorro.

With an Earth MOID above 0.05 AU,  is no longer a potentially hazardous asteroid, but it was classified as such by the MPC until early 2017.

Radar observations show that it measures 2.5 kilometers in diameter. Its surface has a low albedo of 0.048. Rotational lightcurves obtained from photometric observations gave a rotation period of 3.423 hours (best result) with a brightness variation between 0.13 and 0.27 magnitude.  Radar observations gave a concurring period of 3.4256 hours, and subsequent modeling of both radiometric and photometric observations gave a spin axis of (309.0°, −80.0°) in ecliptic coordinates (λ, β).

Trinary system 

In 2008, scientists using the planetary radar at Arecibo Observatory discovered that the object is orbited by two satellites, when the triple asteroid made a close approach to Earth of 0.066 AU (nearly 10 million kilometers). The largest body (preliminarily called Alpha) is spheroid in shape, with principal axes of  km,  km, and  km, with an effective diameter of  km and a density of  g/cm3. The satellites, named Beta and Gamma, are several times smaller in size. Beta is  km in diameter and Gamma  km.

The only other unambiguously identified triple asteroids in the near-Earth population are (136617) 1994 CC, which was discovered to be a triple system in 2009, and 3122 Florence, which was found to be a triple system in September 2017.

Orbital characteristics of satellites 

The orbital properties of the satellites are listed in this table. The orbital planes of both satellites are inclined relative to each other; the relative inclination is about 14 degrees. Such a large inclination is suggestive of past evolutionary events (e.g. close encounter with a terrestrial planet, mean-motion-resonance crossing) that may have excited their orbits from a coplanar configuration to an inclined state.

Exploration

This triple asteroid system is the target for the planned ASTER mission scheduled for launch in 2022 or 2025 by the Brazilian Space Agency.

Notes

References

External links 
 CBET No. 1254 – , Central Bureau for Astronomical Telegrams
 Robert Roy Britt, Triple Asteroid Found Near Earth, Space.com, 13 Feb 2008
 Emily Lakdawalla, Triple Near-Earth Asteroid Discovered  The Planetary Society, 13 Feb 2008
 Images of the asteroid and its moons
 A Lander to Investigate a C-type Triple Near-Earth Asteroid System: 2001 SN263
 Dictionary of Minor Planet Names, Google books
 
 
 

153591
153591
153591
20010920